The Ross Drive Bridge is a historic bridge located in the Washington, D.C. portion of Rock Creek Park, an urban national park listed on the National Register of Historic Places.

Ross Drive Bridge was originally constructed as a timber bridge in 1903 to carry Ross Drive over a tributary ravine of Rock Creek. The bridge was rebuilt in 1907 with a 168-foot span. It was designed and constructed by the United States Army Corps of Engineers.

Boulder Bridge and Ross Drive Bridge were added to the National Register of Historic Places on March 20, 1980. In addition, the bridges are contributing properties to the Rock Creek Park Historic District.

See also
 List of bridges on the National Register of Historic Places in Washington, D.C.
 National Register of Historic Places listings in the District of Columbia

References

External links

 

Open-spandrel deck arch bridges in the United States
Bridges completed in 1903
Bridges completed in 1907
Road bridges on the National Register of Historic Places in Washington, D.C.
Individually listed contributing properties to historic districts on the National Register in Washington, D.C.